Lord commander may refer to:
Lord Commander Eidolon, a character from Warhammer 40,000
Jeor Mormont, a Lord Commander of the Night's Watch in A Song of Ice and Fire
Jon Snow, a Lord Commander of the Night's Watch in A Song of Ice and Fire